Ronald William Loewinsohn (December 15, 1937 – October 14, 2014) was an American poet and novelist who was associated with the poetry of the San Francisco Renaissance since his inclusion in Donald Allen's 1960 poetry anthology, The New American Poetry 1945–1960. He was Professor Emeritus of English at the University of California, Berkeley.

Education and career
Born in Iloilo, Philippines, Loewinsohn and his family relocated to Los Angeles in the United States in 1945. They later lived in The Bronx<ref>Allen, Donald (ed). "Biographical Notes: Ron Loewinsohn." In The New American Poetry," New York: Grove Press,  1960: 141.</ref> and then settled in San Francisco, where he lived until 1967. Loewinsohn credits this proximity to North Beach with his own development as a poet: "I graduated from Abraham Lincoln High School in 1955, with the Beat generation happening all around me. I met all of the principals, heard Ginsberg, Snyder, Whalen and McClure read in Berkeley in April, 1956, and continued to write, mostly poetry, in that vernacular and (I thought) oracular mode." Loewinsohn then traveled, married in 1957, and worked as a lithographer for 12 years. In 1959, he published his first collection of poetry, Watermelons which contained an introduction by Allen Ginsberg and a prefatory letter by William Carlos Williams. He also co-edited the little magazine Change with Richard Brautigan. The poets who were most influential on his work included William Carlos Williams, Allen Ginsberg, Robert Duncan, Jack Spicer,  Richard Brautigan, Philip Whalen, Gary Snyder, Charles Olson, Robert Creeley, Denise Levertov.

In the early 1960s, Loewinsohn taught a poetry workshop at San Francisco State University Extension, an experience which made him realize that he wanted to be a teacher. He received a B.A. from the University of California, Berkeley in 1967 and Ph.D. from the Harvard University in 1971 (his dissertation was on William Carlos Williams). He joined the faculty of the department of English at University of California, Berkeley in 1970 and retired in 2005. His papers are archived in Stanford University's Department of Special Collections and University Archives.

Publications
 Watermelons, New York: Totem Press, 1959
 Poetry included in Donald Allen's The New American Poetry 1945–1960 (1960) by Grove PressThe World of the Lie (poems), Change Press, 1963L'Autre (poems), Black Sparrow Press, 1967The Step (poems), Black Sparrow Press, 1968
The Sea, around us (poem) Black Sparrow Press 1968Meat Air (Selected Poems), Harcourt Brace, 1970The Leaves (poems), Black Sparrow Press, 1973William C. Williams: The Embodiment of Knowledge, (Editor)Goat Dances (poems) Black Sparrow Press, 1976
 Poetry included in Donald Allen's The Postmoderns, (1982) by Grove PressMagnetic Field(s) (novel), Knopf, 1983Where All the Ladders Start (novel), Atlantic Monthly Press, 1987

Awards and honors
Poets Foundation Award (1963)
The Irving Stone Award of the Academy of American Poets (1966)
The Ina Coolbrith Memorial Prize for Poetry (1966)
The University of California Scholar Award (1967)
Woodrow Wilson Foundation graduate fellowship (1967-8)
Harvard University fellowship (1967–70)
National Education Association Fellowship (1979 and 1986) 
Guggenheim Fellowship (1984-5)

Media
Poetry reading
Ron Loewinsohn at SGWU, 1970 (with Robert Hogg) - Concordia University

Video clip
Literature of the Beat Generation - Ron Loewinsohn - OLLI @ University of California, Berkeley

Further reading
Elison, Meg. "Beat movement embers burn bright at Firehouse Gallery North." The Daily Californian,''  January 24, 2014.
Sommer, Julia. "Faculty Profile: Ron Loewinsohn." University of California, Berkeley, July 15, 1998.
Weber, Corey. "A Conversation with Ron Loewinsohn." Summer 2002.

Notes

1937 births
2014 deaths
Beat Generation poets
20th-century American poets
20th-century American novelists
Writers from the San Francisco Bay Area
University of California, Berkeley alumni
Harvard University alumni
University of California, Berkeley College of Letters and Science faculty
American male novelists
American male poets
20th-century American male writers